= Eugene J. Giannini =

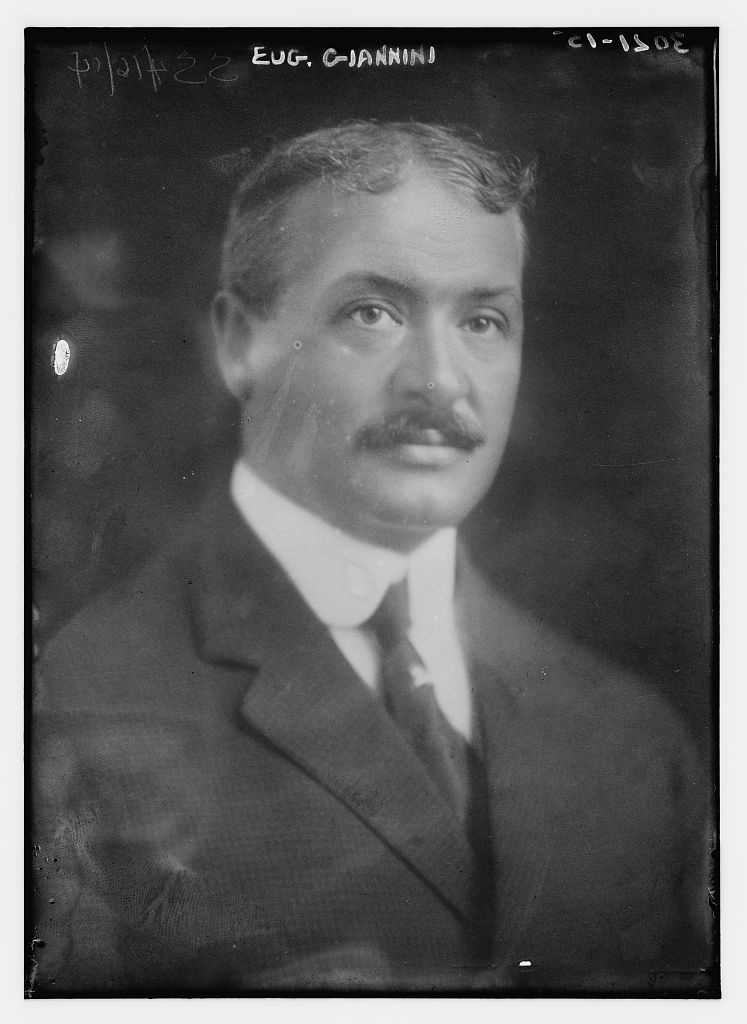
Eugene J. Giannini in 1914

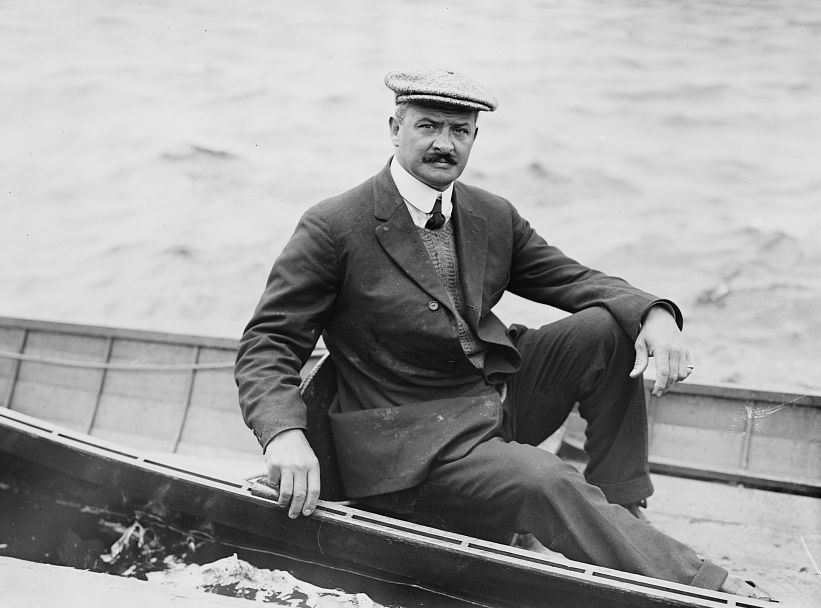

Eugene J. Giannini (1866–1923) was the sport rowing coach for Yale University from 1914 to 1915. He was also the director of athletics for the New York Athletic Club.

== Biography ==
Giannini was born in 1866. He was the sport rowing coach for Yale University from 1914 to 1915.

In 1919, he became the sport rowing coach for Columbia University when he replaced Jim Rice for a single season.

He died in 1923.
